Presidential elections were held in Belarus on 19 December 2010. The elections were had originally been planned for the beginning of 2011. However, the final date was set during an extraordinary session of the National Assembly on 14 September 2010.

Of the ten candidates, incumbent President Alexander Lukashenko was declared the winner by the Central Election Commission with 80% of the vote. Andrei Sannikov received the second-highest percentage. After a protest was violently suppressed by riot police the night after the elections, hundreds of protesters and seven presidential candidates were arrested by the KGB, including runner-up Sannikov.

Western countries decried the election as a farce and an egregious affront to democracy and human rights. The United States and the European Union called for the release of all imprisoned candidates, but took no further action except a travel ban on Lukashenko. By contrast, countries such as Syria, China, Vietnam, and Russia congratulated the re-elected incumbent.

Background
During protests in the aftermath of the 2004 referendum and simultaneous 2004 parliamentary election, there were several arrests of protesters against the election and referendum results and reports of opposition candidates being beaten by police. More demonstrators were arrested during further protests in the aftermath of the 2006 presidential election, the so-called "Jeans Revolution".
 During Lukashenko's presidency Belarus has never held a poll seen as fair by Western monitors.

The new constitution, enacted in 1994, has been amended twice: the first amendment – in 1996 – increased the power of the presidency and established a bicameral parliament. In 2004, the two-term presidential limit was abolished. According to the OSCE, the executive branch of the Belarusian government has significant authority over the other branches; though Article 6 of the constitution of Belarus includes the principle of separation of powers. It has also stated that the Belarusian political system is composed of weak political party structures with no opposition deputies in the previous parliament.

Candidates
The election was called by the House of Representatives on 14 September.

Lukashenko
President Lukashenko (who had been serving his third term), when addressing the press in February 2007, stated that his health permitting, he would run in 2011. According to the result of a referendum in 2004, Lukashenko was declared the first President of Belarus and therefore had no term limits. On 4 May 2010, in an interview with Reuters, he stated: "I have not yet decided whether I will run [...] There are no factors now that would force me to refuse to participate".

Official registration information

Alaksandar Milinkievic, of the "For Freedom" movement (Руху "За Свабоду"), initially announced his bid, but canceled it in September.

Campaign

The run-up to the campaign was marked by a series of Russian media attacks upon the incumbent Alexander Lukashenko. NTV television broadcast throughout July a multi-part documentary entitled 'The Godfather' highlighting the suspicious disappearance of opposition leaders Yury Zacharanka and Viktar Hanchar, businessman Anatol Krasoŭski and journalist Dzmitry Zavadski during the late 1990s, as well as highlighting a statement Lukashenko had made seemingly praising Adolf Hitler.  Lukashenko referred to the media attack as "dirty propaganda".

Campaigning officially began on 19 November, with candidates holding one-to-one meetings across the country and beginning their TV and Radio broadcasts via Belarusian state media. Every candidate was entitled to make two 30-minute broadcasts on Belarusian TV and Radio until 4 December, and could take part in a live media debate.

Death of Aleh Byabenin
In the first week of September 2010, candidate Andrei Sannikov's campaign press secretary Aleh Byabenin was found hanged. Biabienin had been a key member of Sannikov's campaign, and was also director and co-founder of Charter97 – an opposition group and website and one of the few outlets for information on opposition candidates during the election. The official investigation ruled the death as suicide, but Sannikov expressed suspicion; saying that Biabienin had been in good mental health, there was no suicide note, and there were unexplained injuries on the body.

Opinion polls
The Central Election Commission said that all nine opposition figures were likely to get less than half the vote total incumbent Lukashenko would get. No independent verification of the government polls was allowed.

Conduct
The Central Election Commission of Belarus (CEC) said it was ready to cooperate with the OSCE's Office for Democratic Institutions and Human Rights in monitoring the election.

The CEC issued a warning to Uladzimir Nyaklyayew's "Say the Truth!" movement for violating the Electoral Legislation when his organisation gathered signatures of ineligible constituents for "subscription lists."

On 15 December 2010, Andrei Sannikov filed two legal complaint applications with the Central Election Commission, demanding they withdraw the registration of Alexander Lukashenko; and also remove Lidia Yermoshina – the chairperson of the CEC – from office. In both cases, Sannikov cited that their positions were illegal. Jarmošyna was a member of Lukashenko's political team, compromising her neutrality; and was under international scrutiny for purportedly rigging the previous election. He also brought up that Lukashenko ignored his own guidelines on how much time presidential candidates were allowed to speak on television (two appearances for 30 minutes each). Lukashenko also had "propagandistic meetings" at places not included on the Minsk City Executive Committee list where meetings could be held – Lukashenko held a large event at the Palace of the Republic and funded it with the state budget against the rules. The complaints were ineffective.

Results

Aftermath

Protests and crackdown

A large protest rally was organized the evening after the election at October Square in the center of downtown Minsk. This square had historically been the site of large protests, such as the violent suppression of the Jeans Revolution that took place after the disputed 2006 presidential election. However, riot police had cordoned off the square before the event, and people instead gathered at the nearby Liberty Square. While walking to the rally with about a hundred other people, presidential candidates Uladzimir Nyaklyayew and Mikola Statkevich were attacked by armed men dressed in black. Nyaklyayew was beaten to unconsciousness and hospitalized for head injuries. Statkievič later claimed they were attacked by Belarus special forces.

During the rally up to 40,000 people protested against Lukashenko, chanting, "Out!," "Long live Belarus!" and other such slogans. A group of protesters tried to storm a principal government building, smashing windows and doors before riot police pushed them back. Candidate Vital Rymasheuski blamed "drunk provocateurs" for the violence. According to a protester, the demonstrators were largely peaceful and that it was a separate "group of people" who attacked the government building – suggesting also a provocation of force by Belarusian authorities.

According to a protest participant (who is also director of the Belarus Free Theatre), thousands of demonstrators were beaten by riot police, and the square was left spattered with blood. She stated she was forced into a prison van and made to lie face down, while prison guards threatened her with murder and rape if she moved. Andrei Sannikov and his wife Iryna Khalip were among those attacked by police during the rally; and according to eyewitness statements gathered by Charter 97, Sannikov was singled out from the crowd by the OMON for a beating: "Andrei was beaten by truncheons while he was lying. He was beaten on the head [...] all over the body. Andrei was lying and trying to protect himself with his arms. No one was allowed to come near him, so that people could not defend Sannikov."

Lukashenko criticised the protesters, accusing them of "banditry" and saying that "the vandals and hooligans lost their human face. They simply turned into beasts. You saw how our law-enforcers behaved. They stood firm and acted exclusively within the bounds of the law. They defended the country and people from barbarism and ruin. There will be no revolution or criminality in Belarus." He also added that he could not imagine what more he could have done to make the election more democratic.

Censorship, raids
Several websites of the opposition and opposition candidates were blocked or hacked. Facebook, Twitter, YouTube, Google Talk, many email services and LiveJournal were also blocked. The headquarters of Charter97 was stormed by the State Security Committee of the Republic of Belarus (known by the Russian acronym "KGB") and all its staff were arrested. Its editor-in-chief Natalla Radzina  was briefly imprisoned on a charge of "organizing mass disorder". Radina was released in January 2011 on the condition that she leave Minsk; she fled to Moscow before receiving asylum in Lithuania, where she continues to manage Charter 97.

The offices of Polish-funded broadcasters Belsat TV and European Radio for Belarus had also been raided, while relatives of arrested prisoners were denied access to them.

Arrests
Up to 700 opposition activists, including 7 presidential candidates, were arrested in the post election crackdown. Furthermore, at least 25 journalists were arrested; a detained Russian press photographer went on hunger strike on December 21, 2010. According to a detainee, after being shipped to a detainment center after the protests, there were rows of men on every floor standing facing the walls with their hands behind their backs. Women were separated and moved to another floor. Guards made them spend the night standing with faces to the walls, and every detainee was forced to sign statements confessing to "taking part in an unsanctioned rally." 639 prisoners received immediate prison sentences of up to 15 days.

The presidential candidate Uladzimir Nyaklyayew, who had been seriously beaten during the evening of the election day, was taken from hospital by men in civilian clothing who wrapped him in a blanket on his hospital bed and carried him away as his wife screamed. While journalist Iryna Khalip and her husband Andrei Sannikov were on the way to a Minsk hospital to treat Sańnikaŭ's injured legs, their car was intercepted by authorities while Khalip was giving a mobile phone interview to the Moscow radio station Ekho Moskvy - Echo of Moscow. Khalip screamed on air that they were being forcibly removed from their car, arrested, and further beaten. Both Khalip and Sańnikaŭ were detained in a KGB facility in Minsk. Lukashenko later revealed that Khalip's phone was bugged. Ryhor Kastusiou and Dzmitry Wus were re-summoned for further questions by the KGB after being initially released. Kastusioŭ responded to the state crackdown saying "the regime has shown its true essence. We've been thrown 10 years into the past."

The State Security Committee of the Republic of Belarus (KGB) charged the activists, while domestic human rights groups stated they could face up to 15 years in jail. Twenty of the leading opposition figures were facing charges of "organising or participating in a public order disturbance" which is punishable by up to 15 years in jail.

By candidate
Candidates and their post-election fates
Michalevic – arrested, tortured
Nyaklyayew – attacked, arrested, under house arrest
Romanchuk – intimidated
Sannikov – attacked, arrested, sentenced to 5 years
Statkevich – attacked, arrested, sentenced to six years
Wus – arrested, passport confiscated, sentenced to 5.5 years

Lukashenko's chief election rivals were either intimidated (Jaroslav Romanchuk) or sentenced to prison terms just long enough to ensure they will be unable to participate in the 2015 elections (Andrei Sannikov, Mikola Statkevich and Dzmitry Wus). Opponent Uladzimir Nyaklyayew is under house arrest for an unknown period of time. Candidate Ales Michalevic was released from detention on 15 February 2011; in a press conference on 1 March, he accused the KGB of torturing him and other former candidates while he was in custody.

On 17 February 2011 a Belarus court sentenced an opposition activist to four years in jail for taking part in the post-election protests. On 2 March Alexander Otroschenkov—a spokesman for candidate Sańnikaŭ, and who had been working as a journalist for Delfi during the December protests—was sentenced to 4 years in prison for violating "Article 293" of the penal code ("organizing and taking part in a mass riot"). Otroschenkov and many others are listed as prisoners of conscience by Amnesty International.

Andrei Sannikov was convicted of the charge of "organizing a mass protest" on 14 May 2011 and sentenced to five years in a high security prison.

Reactions
The West generally denounced the election as fraudulent; the European Union renewed a travel ban effective 31 January 2011 – prohibiting Lukashenko and 156 of his associates from traveling to EU member countries – as a result of violent crackdowns of opposition supporters by Lukashenko's government forces following the election.

Lukashenko's inauguration ceremony of 22 January 2011 was boycotted by European Union ambassadors, while fellow CIS countries did not send officials higher than ambassadors. During this ceremony Lukashenko defended the legitimacy of his re-election and vowed that Belarus would never have its own version of the 2004 Ukrainian Orange Revolution and Georgia's 2003 Rose Revolution.

Domestic
 – Lukashenko called the percentage of voters who voted for him "quite good". According to Lukashenko his opponents got few votes because "the ex-candidates had not committed any deeds to convince the Belarusian nation to vote for them. People learned their names two months before". He also stressed: “They may have a great future ahead of them but they have to work for it. If they do it, they will find their place in Belarus and will always enjoy support of the incumbent president”.

International organisations
 – The Secretary-General of the United Nations Ban Ki-moon noted the serious concerns voiced by observer groups regarding the electoral process and post-electoral developments and called on the government to observe fully human rights and due process. He also called on Belarusian President Aleksandr Lukashenko to release political prisoners arrested following the elections.
 – The Commonwealth of Independent States recognised the election as legitimate.
 – The EU High Representative Catherine Ashton said in an official statement that "unfortunately, the trend set by the relative progress during the campaigning period was not followed by a transparent and fair polling process. It is especially regrettable that election night was marred by violence, which I strongly condemn. In particular, the beating and detention of several opposition leaders, including presidential candidates, is unacceptable." The President of the European Parliament Jerzy Buzek added that "beating independent election candidates is unacceptable. The action was outrageous"; he also launched a European Parliamentary investigation into the election.
A joint statement from the Foreign Ministers of the Czech Republic (Karel Schwarzenberg), Germany (Guido Westerwelle), Poland (Radosław Sikorski) and Sweden (Carl Bildt) on 23 December declared that "there can be no business-as-usual between the European Union and Belarus’ president, Aleksandr Lukashenko, after what has happened since the presidential election in Belarus[.] [...] continued positive engagement with Mr. Lukashenko at the moment seems to be a waste of time and money. He has made his choice — and it is a choice against everything the European Union stands for." They added that "while the voting proceeded in an orderly fashion, the counting of the votes turned into a charade. The report of the independent observers assessed the counting as 'bad' or 'very bad' in nearly half the polling stations they could observe, and it is not unreasonable to assume that it was even worse in the others. It became obvious that there were orders not to count votes, but to deliver a predetermined result. The combination of vote-rigging and outright repression makes what Milosevic tried to do in Serbia in 2000 pale in comparison. What we have seen brings back memories of the introduction of martial law in Poland in 1981."
OSCE – The Organization for Security and Co-operation in Europe called the election "flawed" and that Belarus has a "considerable way to go in meeting its OSCE commitments." In response, Lukashenko said the OSCE had no right to speak about events in Belarus which happened after the election. He also called the OSCE criticism "amoral" because Belarus is an OSCE member and thus "experts and officials are subordinate to virtually 56 heads of state, including the Belarusian president."

Expressions of congratulations
 – President Ilham Aliyev congratulated Lukashenko.
 – President Hu Jintao congratulated Lukashenko.
 – President Mikheil Saakashvili congratulated Lukashenko on his victory.
 – Nursultan Nazarbayev congratulated Lukashenko. The Chairman of the Kazakh Senate, Kassym-Jomart Tokayev, also said that "the people of Belarus voted for the incumbent president, and this choice will enjoy the respect of Kazakhstan."
 – Although President Dmitry Medvedev commented on December 20 that the Belarusian election was an internal matter and wished for good relations between the two neighbouring states; Medvedev waited until December 25 before he officially congratulated Lukashenko. Russian electoral observers also said the election was legitimate.
Patriarch of Moscow Kirill I congratulated Lukashenko on his re-election.
 – President Bashar al-Assad congratulated Lukashenko.
 – President Viktor Yanukovych sent a letter of congratulations to Lukashenko. The Foreign Ministry stated that it would take into account the views of international observers in formulating its opinion about the election and expressed concern about the use of violence against opposition demonstrators. One Ukrainian member of the OSCE election observation mission, parliament deputy of the Party of Regions Oleksandr Stoyan, stated he saw no violations during the election and hoped that the Party of Regions would welcome the election result.
 – President Hugo Chávez congratulated Lukashenko.
 – President Nguyễn Minh Triết congratulated Lukashenko on his victory.

Expressions of concerns
 – Foreign Minister Radosław Sikorski stated that a "reliable source" had informed him that the official results of the election had been falsified.
 – On the night of the election, the Swedish Minister for Foreign Affairs Carl Bildt reacted sharply about the news of a crackdown on the opposition rally in Minsk and said that the beating of Nyaklyayew "is very disturbing and totally unacceptable."
 – The United States did not recognise the result as legitimate and called for the immediate release of all opposition presidential candidates arrested by authorities.
In a joint statement on 24 December 2010, US Secretary of State Hillary Clinton and the EU's Catherine Ashton called for the immediate release of all 600 detained demonstrators as well as all presidential candidates. Both the EU and the US backed the OSCE's report asking Belarusian authorities to complete the reform of the electoral process it demanded. They said that without "considerable progress" in respect to democracy and human rights relations between Belarus and the EU and the US would not improve: "The Government of Belarus should take the steps necessary to create political space for political activists, civil society representatives, and independent journalists. The elections and their aftermath represent an unfortunate step backwards in the development of democratic governance and respect for human rights in Belarus. The people of Belarus deserve better."
On March 17, 2011 the United States Senate unanimously passed a resolution condemning the election as illegitimate and fraudulent; and calling on the Belarus regime to immediately release all political prisoners captured during the peaceful election protests.

Analysis
Though opposition figures alleged intimidation and "dirty tricks" were being played, Al Jazeera reported that the election was seen as comparatively open as a result of desire to improve relations with both Europe at-large and the United States.

Political scientists and commentators said that Lukashenko's handling of opposition protests is seen as the result of the choice of his government to trade a foreign policy loss for a perceived domestic gain in regards to worse relations with the European Union in return for a stable internal political situation. However, this was seen as fragile, as dissidents remain active (up to 25% of the population), though dissident leaders are marginalised and left out of any meaningful cooperative mechanism thus strengthening their isolation and opposition to current ruling élite. Lukashenko's main achievement, effective state-building of Belarus, is seen as in possible danger because of the lack of consensus over a shared Belarusian national identity, one that is still divided between an older Soviet-base one, and supported by the government, versus a symbolic medieval-based one, advocated by the opposition.

New government
On 28 December Lukashenko appointed Mikhail Myasnikovich as Prime Minister, replacing Sergei Sidorsky.

References

External links
Presidential elections in Belarus

Presidential elections in Belarus
Belarus
President